Hamad Al-Jayzani (born 4 March 1993) is a Saudi professional footballer who currently plays as a full back for Al-Wehda .

On 4 July 2018, Al-Jayzani signed for Hajer.

References

External links 
 

Living people
1993 births
Saudi Arabian footballers
Saudi Arabia youth international footballers
Al-Shabab FC (Riyadh) players
Al-Faisaly FC players
Al-Riyadh SC players
Al-Qadsiah FC players
Hajer FC players
Damac FC players
Al-Wehda Club (Mecca) players
Saudi First Division League players
Saudi Professional League players
Association football fullbacks